Ash Shuwayhah is a village in Al Buraimi Governorate, in northeastern Oman. It lies north of Abud.

References

Populated places in Oman